is a passenger railway station in the city of Midori, Gunma, Japan, operated by the private railway operator Tōbu Railway. It is numbered "TI-54".

Lines

Station layout
The station consists of a single side platform serving traffic in both directions.

Adjacent stations

History
Azami Station was opened on May 5, 1937. During work to extend the platform from 1954-1955, extensive Jōmon period archaeological remains were discovered, which were proclaimed a Gunma Prefectural Historic Site in 1960.

From March 17, 2012, station numbering was introduced on all Tōbu lines, with Azami Station becoming "TI-54".

Passenger statistics
In fiscal 2019, the station was used by an average of 573 passengers daily (boarding passengers only).

Surrounding area
 Kiryu University
Azami Marsh

See also
 List of railway stations in Japan

References

External links

 Tobu station information  
	

Tobu Kiryu Line
Stations of Tobu Railway
Railway stations in Gunma Prefecture
Railway stations in Japan opened in 1937
Midori, Gunma